(John) Martin Elliott Hyland is professor of mathematical logic at the University of Cambridge and a fellow of King's College, Cambridge. His interests include mathematical logic, category theory, and theoretical computer science.

Education
Hyland was educated at the University of Oxford where he was awarded a Doctor of Philosophy degree in 1975 for research supervised by Robin Gandy.

Research and career
Martin Hyland is best known for his work on category theory applied to logic (proof theory, recursion theory), theoretical computer science (lambda-calculus and semantics) and higher-dimensional algebra. In particular he is known for work on the effective topos (within topos theory) and on game semantics. His former doctoral students include Eugenia Cheng and  Valeria de Paiva.

References

Living people
Year of birth missing (living people)
Fellows of King's College, Cambridge
English mathematicians
Category theorists
Cambridge mathematicians